Maréchal-des-logis Gilbert Jean Uteau was a French World War I flying ace credited with five aerial victories.

Biography
See also Aerial victory standards of World War I

Gilbert Jean Uteau volunteered for military service as an artilleryman about a year after World War I began, on 10 July 1915. The next notice of Uteau in the archives is his posting to Escadrille Spa.315 on 24 November 1917. Flying in defense of Belfort, he shot down two German airplanes and two observation balloons between 11 July and 21 October 1918. On 14 September, after his fourth triumph, Uteau was awarded theMedaille Militaire for valor. By the war's end on 11 November 1918, he had also earned the Croix de Guerre with six palmes and an etoile.

Postwar, he was taken into the Legion d'honneur. He became a journalist, writing under the pseudonym of Le Bailli. He died in Bordeaux on 5 April 1963.

Sources of information

Reference

 Franks, Norman; Bailey, Frank (1993). Over the Front: The Complete Record of the Fighter Aces and Units of the United States and French Air Services, 1914–1918. London, UK: Grub Street Publishing. .

1897 births
1963 deaths
French World War I flying aces